YMK (Yelle Malleshappa Kannada) High School is a Government Aided co-educational school in Adoni, Andhra Pradesh, India. Founded in 1947, it is affiliated to the Board of Secondary Education, Andhra Pradesh. It prepares students for the SSC (Std 10).

Academics 

YMKHS, a day school with classes from VI to Std.X, is one of the famous schools in the town which offers secondary education in three mediums viz., English, Telugu and Kannada. It has an average class size of 100-110 students.

Extra-curricular activities

Sports
Students are encouraged to participate in town-level and district-level sports competitions which include sports like cricket, foot-ball, hockey, base-ball, basket-ball etc. The school has a vast play ground where so many sports competitions were successfully organised. Students are also encouraged to participate in Athletics.

Science Fair
The school organised district level and state level Science Fairs in which students from different places had participated.

Golden Jublee Function 
YMKHS celebrated its Golden Jublee Function in 1998 on the successful completion of 50 glorious years.

Educational institutions established in 1947
1947 establishments in India